McQueeney is a surname. Notable people with the surname include:

Robert McQueeney (1919–2002), American actor
Patricia McQueeney (1927–2005),  American actress

See also
McQueeney, Texas, census-designated place (CDP) in Guadalupe County, Texas, USA
Lake McQueeney, reservoir on the Guadalupe River in the USA